This is an incomplete list of notable treasures that are currently lost or missing. The existence of some of these treasures is mythical or disputed.

List

See also

 Art theft and looting during World War II
 Looted art
 Lost artworks
 Lost film
 Lost literary work
 Lost television broadcast
 Nazi gold
 Nazi plunder

References

External links
 List of Lost Treasures

Treasure
Treasure
Treasure